Telep is an urban neighborhood of the city of Novi Sad, Serbia.

Name

The word "telep" means "settlement" in Hungarian. The first name of this neighborhood was Darányi-telep (Serbian: Daranjijevo Naselje). Between 1927 and 1944, the official name of the settlement was Adamovićevo Naselje (this name was in fact used for both: present-day Telep and present-day Adamovićevo Naselje, which are today two separate city neighborhoods).

History
In the medieval period (13th-16th century), a settlement named Sent Marton (Kűszentmárton) existed at this location.

Modern settlement of Telep started to develop during the 1890s. Initially, settlement existed only in the area of present-day northern Telep, while southern Telep started to develop in 1902. In 1931, the population of the settlement numbered at around 9,000 inhabitants, mostly ethnic Hungarians.

Population
Telep once was an ethnic Hungarian neighbourhood of Novi Sad, while today it is predominantly populated by Serbs. Sizable Hungarian minority is still present in the area. According to an estimation by the city's registry, the population of Telep was 17,130 in mid-2005.

Geography
Telep is located in the western part of the city and covers an area of 3.45 km². Its northern borders are Futoški put (Futog Road) and Novosadski put (Novi Sad Road), its western border is Šumska ulica (Šumska Street), its southern border is Podunavska ulica (Podunavska Street), and its eastern borders are Ulica Ribarsko ostrvo (Ribarsko ostrvo Street), Ulica Sima Matavulja (Simo Matavulj Street), and the newly built Subotički bulevar (Subotica Boulevard). 

The neighbouring settlements are: Novo Naselje and Satelit in the north, Adamovićevo Naselje and Liman IV in the east, Kameničko ostrvo (not a settlement, but a tourist destination) in the south, and Adice in the west.

Telep is divided into Northern Telep and Southern Telep. A new Somborski bulevar (Sombor Boulevard) will be built between these two parts of the settlement, at the former location of the rail tracks Novi Sad-Sombor. The new boulevard will be the main street in this part of the city.

Local communities
The neighborhood is located in the Novi Sad municipality, and it is divided into three local communities: Južni Telep, Bratstvo-Telep and Nikola Tesla-Telep.

Culture
Telep is the centre of the city's Hungarian population. Also in the neighborhood are a Roman Catholic church and an Evangelistic church. In the 1990s, a new Orthodox church was built in Telep to accommodate the increasing population of Orthodox faith. 

In 1945, the Hungarian cultural centre "Petőfi Sándor" was established in Telep, which preserves the local culture of Hungarians in the city.

Education
Nikola Tesla Elementary School
Jožef Atila Elementary School
Laza Kostić secondary school (gymnasium)

Transportation
The main bus lines from the city centre to Telep are No.12 and No.6, but there is also bus line No.7, which passes along the borders of the neighborhood. Bus lines 4, 9, 11A and 11B also pass nearby.

Notes

See also
Neighborhoods of Novi Sad

References
Milorad Grujić, Vodič kroz Novi Sad i okolinu, Novi Sad, 2004.
Jovan Mirosavljević, Novi Sad - atlas ulica, Novi Sad, 1998.
Enciklopedija Novog Sada, Sveska 1, Novi Sad, 1993.

Gallery

External links

 Neighborhoods of Novi Sad
 Detailed map of Novi Sad and Telep

Novi Sad neighborhoods